Gudur, Kurnool district is a Nagar Panchayath and a Mandal HQ of Gudur Mandal in Kurnool district in the state of Andhra Pradesh in India.

It comes under Kodumur assembly constituency and Kurnool Parliament Constituency.

 Gudur is Situated on Yemmiganur - Kurnool Road.
 Nearest Railway Station is Kurnool City Railway Station.
 Nearest Airport is Kurnool Airport.

Demographics 
According to 2011 Census Gudur Town has a population of 22,270.

Governance
The town was upgraded from Gram panchayat to Nagar panchayat on 23 June 2011. Gudur is 27 km away from Kurnool.

References

Cities and towns in Kurnool district